Admiral Boone may refer to:

Joel Thompson Boone (1889–1974), U.S. Navy vice admiral
Walter F. Boone (1898–1995), U.S. Navy admiral

See also
Thomas Boone (character), fictional U.S. Navy rear admiral in the TV series, JAG